Oleksiy Kazanin (born 22 May 1982) is a Ukrainian race walker. He is married to Olena Shumkina who is also a race walker.

Achievements

References

1982 births
Living people
Ukrainian male racewalkers
Athletes (track and field) at the 2008 Summer Olympics
Athletes (track and field) at the 2012 Summer Olympics
Olympic athletes of Ukraine
Sportspeople from Kyiv Oblast